"Just a Friend" is a song written, produced and performed by American hip hop artist Biz Markie. It was released in September 1989 as the lead single from his album, The Biz Never Sleeps. It is Markie's most successful single, reaching number 9 on the Billboard Hot 100 in 1990.

Background 
The song interpolates the 1968 song "(You) Got What I Need" recorded by Freddie Scott, whose basic chord and melody provided the base for the song's chorus. Markie's lyrics describe romantic frustration after pursuing a woman who is actually romantically involved with another man who she falsely claims is "just a friend." Due to the widespread popularity of the song along with its acclaim and its influence on pop culture (and Markie's failure to have another charting Hot 100 song), Biz was classified by VH1 as a one-hit wonder, and "Just a Friend" was ranked 81st on VH1's 100 Greatest One-Hit Wonders in 2000, and later as number 100 on VH1's 100 Greatest Songs of Hip Hop in 2008. Karma, a staff record producer for Cold Chillin' Records, told Vibe magazine in 2005 that he produced the single, but never received credit. The single was certified platinum on April 12, 1990. In 2021, it was ranked at No. 480 on Rolling Stone's "Top 500 Best Songs of All Time".

Music video
The music video, directed by Lionel C. Martin, chronicles the rapper/singer's woman problems. At the climax of the video, Biz Markie's character stumbles upon a girl he was trying to date – not his girlfriend – kissing another man she had previously referred to as "just a friend". It also includes a scene of Biz Markie singing the chorus dressed as Mozart in 18th-century clothing with a powdered wig in a candlelit room while playing the piano.

Legacy
In November 2010, actor Jeff Goldblum performed the song in a duet with Markie on Late Night with Jimmy Fallon. The duet was highly requested by fans of the show and was set up by Fallon and the Roots.

Charts

Weekly charts

Year-end charts

Certifications

References

External links
 
 
 

1989 songs
1989 singles
1980s ballads
Biz Markie songs
Cold Chillin' Records singles
Music videos directed by Lionel C. Martin
Song recordings produced by Biz Markie
Songs written by Biz Markie
Torch songs
Songs about friendship